Toshihide Matsui and Yi Chu-huan were the defending champions but only Yi chose to defend his title, partnering Peng Hsien-yin. Yi lost in the first round to Gong Maoxin and Zhang Ze.

Gong and Zhang Ze went on to win the title after defeating Hua Runhao and Zhang Zhizhen 6–4, 3–6, [10–4] in the final.

Seeds

Draw

References
 Main Draw

Shanghai Challenger - Doubles
2018 Doubles